Luzarches is a commune in the Val-d'Oise department in Île-de-France in northern France. Luzarches station has rail connections to Sarcelles and Paris.

Just south of the town is a monument on the D316, which commemorates the closest distance to Paris that German units reached during the advance westwards in September 1914.

Twin towns
  Montrose, Angus, Scotland, United Kingdom has been twinned with Luzarches since 1994.

References

External links
Association of Mayors of the Val d'Oise 
Site officiel de Luzarches entre ville et village 
Le Twitter de Luzarches 

Communes of Val-d'Oise